This page records the details of the Japan national football team in 2006.

Schedule

Players statistics

Top goal scorers for 2006

Manager
The manager was Zico up to 2006 World Cup. He was replaced by Ivica Osim.

Kits

References

External links
Japan Football Association

Japan national football team results
2006 in Japanese football
Japan